William Rodger Thomson Solomon (23 April 1872 in Fort Beaufort, Cape Colony – 12 July 1964 in Cradock, Eastern Cape) was a South African cricketer who played in one Test in 1899.

Solomon was selected in South Africa's side for the First Test after scoring two courageous fifties against the touring English team in February 1899. Until Norman Giddy scored 66 for Border in the seventh match of the tour no batsman had reached 50 against the English side. Then Solomon scored 64 for a Johannesburg XV and 52 for Transvaal. He was unable to continue this success into the Test series, however, and after making 2 in each innings he was not selected again.

References

External links
 
 

1872 births
1964 deaths
People from Raymond Mhlaba Local Municipality
South Africa Test cricketers
South African cricketers
Eastern Province cricketers
Gauteng cricketers